Congé-sur-Orne is a commune in the Sarthe department in the Pays de la Loire region in north-western France.

Its inhabitants are called 'Congéennes' and 'Congéens'; most  of its population resides in the village, locally  called le bourg; the  rest is  disseminated in hamlets and in isolated farms.

See also
Communes of the Sarthe department

References

Pictures

Communes of Sarthe